Judith Ungemach ( Zeidler, born 11 May 1968) is a German-Australian world champion rower and Olympic gold and bronze medalist.

Early life and education
Zeidler was born in Beeskow, Brandenburg. She started rowing at the age of thirteen at the East German best rowing club Dynamo Berlin (later Sport Club Berlin).

Career
After three World Junior titles, Zeidler won gold in the women's eight at the 1988 Summer Olympics. A year later she won the world titles in Bled (Slovenia) in the coxless pair. At the 1992 Summer Olympics she won bronze in the women's eight with the unified German eight.

Zeidler lives with her husband, Matthias Ungemach, and two sons and one daughter on Sydney's Northern Beaches.

Achievements

Junior world championships 
 1984: Jönköping (SWE) – 1st place (quadruple scull)
 1986: Roudnice (CZE) – 1st place (quadruple scull)

World championships
 1989: Bled (SLO) – 1st place (coxless pair)
 1990: Lake Barrington (AUS) – 3rd place (coxless four)
 1991: Vienna (AUT) – 3rd place (coxless four)

Olympics 
 1988: Seoul (KOR) – 1st place (eight)
 1992: Barcelona (SPA) – 3rd place (eight)

See also
 German Australian

References

External links
 Judith Zeidler dataOlympics profile

1968 births
Living people
People from Beeskow
People from Bezirk Frankfurt
East German female rowers
German female rowers
Sportspeople from Brandenburg
Olympic rowers of East Germany
Olympic rowers of Germany
Rowers at the 1988 Summer Olympics
Rowers at the 1992 Summer Olympics
Olympic gold medalists for East Germany
Olympic bronze medalists for Germany
Olympic medalists in rowing
Medalists at the 1992 Summer Olympics
Medalists at the 1988 Summer Olympics
World Rowing Championships medalists for East Germany
World Rowing Championships medalists for Germany
Recipients of the Patriotic Order of Merit in gold
Recipients of the Silver Laurel Leaf